Luo Rui (born 26 November 2005) is a Chinese artistic gymnast.

Luo is a two-time national champion (2019, 2021) in the team event (with the Guangdong team) and a 2021 silver medalist on uneven bars (tied with Wei Xiaoyuan).

In May 2021, following that year's Chinese nationals where she placed eighth in the all-around, she was named to the provisional Chinese Olympic squad.

At the 2021 World Championships, Luo took the bronze medal in the uneven bars final behind teammate Wei Xiaoyuan and Brazil's Rebeca Andrade. She also qualified to the balance beam final in first place but fell in the final, finishing fifth.

References 

2005 births
Living people
Chinese female artistic gymnasts
Medalists at the World Artistic Gymnastics Championships
21st-century Chinese women